In July 1965, Commonwealth Railways placed an order with Commonwealth Engineering, Granville for eight  air-conditioned stainless steel sleeping carriages and one dining carriage for use on the Trans Australian. The first was delivered in July 1966.

The carriages were built to a slightly narrower loading gauge than existing stock to allow their operation on other systems as a precursor to the commencement of transcontinental services. In May 1967, Commonwealth Railways placed an order for a further 59 carriages in various configurations for use on the Indian Pacific. Further orders saw the fleet total 124.

Of these 60 were jointly owned by the New South Wales Government Railways, Commonwealth Railways and the Western Australian Government Railways for the Indian Pacific and the balance by the Commonwealth Railways for the Trans-Australian. In practice they were used interchangeably.

Since 1980, the stock has been used on The Ghan from Adelaide to Alice Springs. From November 1983 until November 1987, they were used on The Alice from Sydney to Alice Springs. More recently they have been used on The Overland from Adelaide to Melbourne and The Southern Spirit.

In July 1975, all were included in the transfer of Commonwealth Railways to Australian National and in October 1997 to Great Southern Rail.

Construction
Between 1966 and 1975, the following carriages were built by Commonwealth Engineering at Granville for the Indian Pacific, Trans Australian and Ghan services:
 8x BRG Second Class Twin berth sleeping cars (36 berths in 18 compartments) numbered 168 to 175.
 1x DE Dining car (48 seats) numbered 176.
 9x HGM Power and guards vans numbered 202 to 205, 296 to 298, 316 and 317.
 7x ER Dormitory staff cars numbered 206 to 211 and 313.
 22x BRJ Second Class Twin berth sleeping cars (36 berths in 18 compartments) numbered 212 to 223, 267 to 271 and 299 to 303.
 8x CDF Second Class Club/Dining cars numbered 224 to 229 and 265 to 266.
 11x DF First Class Dining cars (48 seats) numbered 230 to 235, 264, 294 to 295, 304 and 327.
 7x AFC First Class Lounge cars numbered 236 to 239 and 305 to 307.
 13x ARJ First Class Roomette sleeping cars (20 berths in 20 compartments) numbered 240 to 245, 272 to 273 and 282 to 286.
 23x ARL First Class Twinette sleeping cars (18 berths in 9 compartments + conductor's compartment) numbered 246 to 250, 261 to 263, 289 to 293, 308 to 310 and 320 to 326.
 6x ARM First Class Deluxe Twinette sleeping cars numbered 251 to 254 and 287 to 288.
 9x HM Baggage and mail vans numbered 255 to 259, 311 to 312 and 318 to 319.
 1x SSA Governor General's special car numbered 260.

Fleet details

Individual carriage details

Gallery

References

Commonwealth Railways
Railway coaches of Australia